Bushkan-e Mirzai (also Romanized as Būshkān-e Mīrzā’ī; also known as Būshegān, Būshgān, Būshgān-e Mīrzā’ī, and Būshīkān-e Mīrzā’ī) is a village in Deris Rural District, in the Central District of Kazerun County, Fars Province, Iran. At the 2006 census, its population was 88, in 21 families.

References 

Populated places in Kazerun County